Hoofddorppleinbuurt is a neighborhood of Amsterdam, Netherlands, part of the borough of Amsterdam-Zuid. The district had 10,771 inhabitants as of 1 January 2005. The total area is 96.71 hectares.

Hoofddorppleinbuurt was built in the 1920s. Since 1927 the neighborhood through the Zeilbrug has been connected to Amstelveenseweg. It is a mostly a residential neighborhood, but there are a few companies and other institutions.

References

Neighbourhoods of Amsterdam